Annamanada Mahadeva Temple is a Hindu temple located at Annamanada in Thrissur District, Kerala. The presiding deity of the temple is Shiva. The shivling is almost four feet tall and is considered as the Kiratamoorthy in a pleasing mood while giving Pashupatastra to Arjuna. It is considered to be one of the 108 jyotirlinga ( 108 divine abodes of Lord Shiva). The temple is being administered by the Cochin Devaswom Board.

See also
 Temples of Kerala

References

Shiva temples in Kerala
Hindu temples in Thrissur district
108 Shiva Temples